The George Klein Tourist Court Historic District, also known as Green Elf Court, is a historic tourist accommodation at 501 Morrison Street in Hot Springs, Arkansas.  Now an apartment complex, it consists of seven single-story cabins, an elaborate American Craftsman style manager's house, and an octagonal central residence unit with a cantilevered second floor and a bellcast roof.  The complex was built about 1940, is one of the city's finest example of a Craftsman style tourist court, a popular form of traveler accommodation prior to World War II.

The property was listed on the National Register of Historic Places in 1993.

See also
National Register of Historic Places listings in Garland County, Arkansas

References

Buildings and structures completed in 1940
Buildings and structures in Hot Springs, Arkansas
Historic districts on the National Register of Historic Places in Arkansas
National Register of Historic Places in Hot Springs, Arkansas